Harry George Powlett, 4th Duke of Cleveland  (19 April 1803 – 21 August 1891), styled The Honourable Harry Vane until 1827 and Lord Harry Vane from 1827 to 1864, who in 1864 adopted by Royal Licence the surname and arms of Powlett in lieu of Vane, was an English landowner, diplomat and Whig statesman. During the crisis which led to the collapse of Lord Russell's government in 1866 over the question of parliamentary reform, he was considered a possible compromise prime minister in a Whig-Conservative anti-reform coalition government, but such plans came to nothing.

Origins
Vane was the third son of William Vane, 1st Duke of Cleveland KG (1766–1842), by his wife Lady Catherine Margaret Powlett, daughter of Admiral Harry Powlett, 6th Duke of Bolton (1720–1794). His elder brothers were Henry Vane, 2nd Duke of Cleveland KG (1788–1864), and William Vane, 3rd Duke of Cleveland (1792–1864).

Career
Vane was educated at Oriel College, Oxford. He entered the foreign service and held posts in Paris and Stockholm before entering the House of Commons in 1841 as a member of parliament for South Durham, which seat he held until 1859, when he switched to Hastings, which he represented until his accession to the dukedom and elevation to the House of Lords on the death of his brother on 6 September 1864. On 18 November 1864 he adopted by Royal License the surname and arms of Powlett in lieu of his patronymic, in accordance with the will of his maternal grandmother the Duchess of Bolton (Katherine Lowther (d.1809), daughter of Robert Lowther, sister of James Lowther, 1st Earl of Lonsdale, and wife of the 6th Duke of Bolton). He was made a Knight of the Garter in 1865. During the crisis which led to the collapse in 1866 of Lord Russell's second ministry over the question of parliamentary reform, he was considered a possible compromise prime minister in a Whig-Conservative anti-reform coalition government, but such plans came to nothing. In 1867 he served as treasurer of the Salop Infirmary in Shrewsbury, and in 1885 financed the rebuilding of the parish church at Uppington, Shropshire where part of his estates were.

Marriage
At Chevening on 2 August 1854, Vane married Lady Dalmeny (1819–1901), the daughter of Philip Henry Stanhope, 4th Earl Stanhope and widow of Archibald Primrose, Lord Dalmeny, by whom she was the mother of Archibald Primrose, 5th Earl of Rosebery, Prime Minister of the United Kingdom, who was seven years old at that time. The marriage was without issue.

Death and succession
Cleveland died in August 1891, aged 88, at his London townhouse Cleveland House, 16 St James's Square, Westminster, London. Thereupon the line of succession to his peerages became unclear.  In 1891 the Committee of Privileges of the House of Lords declared the title of Duke of Cleveland extinct but declared Henry de Vere Vane to be the rightful heir of the title Baron Barnard and to the estates of Raby Castle and Barnard Castle, which latter had been purchased in 1626 by the Vane family.

References

External links 

 

1803 births
1891 deaths
Alumni of Oriel College, Oxford
Members of the Parliament of the United Kingdom for English constituencies
Dukes of Cleveland
Knights of the Garter
Whig (British political party) MPs for English constituencies
UK MPs 1841–1847
UK MPs 1847–1852
UK MPs 1852–1857
UK MPs 1857–1859
UK MPs 1859–1865
Cleveland, D4
Harry
Presidents of the Oxford Union
Barons Barnard